Several New Testament passages contain lists that have come to be labeled Catalogues of Vices and Virtues by scholars. The catalogue form was extremely popular in 1st century Hellenism. Plato wrote the earliest catalogue.  They could easily be adapted for a range of philosophies and ethics. Philo, a hellenized Jew, also wrote several. There is surprisingly little difference between the Christian and non-Christian catalogues. The longest list is in the Epistle to the Galatians and every item is common among pagan catalogues except one. Catalogues vary by size, content, and style. There was, apparently, little interest in Christians for creativity, systemization, or completeness.  Their primary function, therefore, was to show that Christian morality should approximately conform to the well accepted morality of Hellenism. Therefore, the catalogues should not be considered creedal or specifically Christian.

Early Christian Catalogues
Romans 1:29-31
Romans 13:13
1 Corinthians 5:10
1 Corinthians 6:9
2 Corinthians 12:20
Galatians 5:19-23
Ephesians 4:31
Colossians 3:5, 8
1 Timothy 1:9
2 Timothy 3:2-5
Titus 3:3
1 Peter 2:1
1 Peter 4:3
1 Peter 4:15
Apocalypse of Peter
Didache
Epistle of Barnabas

Later Christian Catalogues

See also
Seven virtues
Aristotle's list of virtues
Seven deadly sins

Resources
Hans Dieter Betz, Galatians. Philadelphia: Fortress Press, 1979. p281-283

New Testament theology